Kosmos 295 ( meaning Cosmos 295), known before launch as DS-P1-Yu No.29, was a Soviet satellite which was launched in 1969 as part of the Dnepropetrovsk Sputnik programme. It was a  spacecraft, which was built by the Yuzhnoye Design Bureau, and was used as a radar calibration target for anti-ballistic missile tests.

Launch 
Kosmos 295 was launched from Site 133/1 at the Plesetsk Cosmodrome, atop a Kosmos-2I 63SM carrier rocket. The launch occurred on 22 August 1969 at 14:14:57 UTC, and resulted in Kosmos 295's successful deployment into low Earth orbit. Upon reaching orbit, it was assigned its Kosmos designation, and received the International Designator 1969-073A.

It remained in orbit until it decayed and reentered the atmosphere on 1 December 1969. It was the twenty-fourth of seventy nine DS-P1-Yu satellites to be launched, and the twenty-second of seventy two to successfully reach orbit. Kosmos 295 replaced the previous DS-P1-Yu satellite, #23, which had failed to reach orbit due to a problem with the second stage of its carrier rocket.

See also 

 1969 in spaceflight

References 

Spacecraft launched in 1969
Kosmos satellites
Dnepropetrovsk Sputnik program